Ignazio is a masculine Italian given name. Notable people with the name include:

Arts

Ignazio Collino (1736–1793), Italian sculptor
Ignazio Fresu (born 1957), Italian sculptor
Ignazio Gardella (1905–1999), Italian architect and designer
Ignazio Hugford (1703–1777), Italian painter
Ignazio Marabitti (1719–1797), Sicilian sculptor
Ignazio Oliva (17th century), Italian painter
Carlo Ignazio Pozzi (1786–1842), Italian painter and architect
Ignazio Stern (1679–1748), Austrian painter

Literature

Ignazio Buttitta (1899–1997), Sicilian dialectal poet
Ignazio Giorgi (1675–1737), Italian poet and translator
Ignazio Silone (1900–1978), Italian novelist and poet

Music

Ignazio Albertini (1644–1685), Italian violinist and composer
Ignazio Cirri (1711–1787), Italian organist and composer
Ignazio Boschetto, Italian singer-songwriter & member of Il Volo
Ignazio Donati (1570–1638), Italian composer
Ignazio Fiorillo (1715–1787), Italian composer
Ignazio Marini (1811–1873), Italian operatic bass
Carlo Ignazio Monza (1680–1739), Italian composer
Ignazio Pollice (1684–1705), Sicilian composer
Ignazio Prota (1690–1748), Italian composer

Politics

Ignazio Calvi (1797–1872), Italian patriot and chess player
Ignazio Cassis (born 1961), Swiss physician and politician
Paolo Ignazio Maria Thaon di Revel (1888–1973), Italian politician
Ignazio La Russa (born 1947), Italian politician
Ignazio Marino (born 1955), Italian surgeon and politician

Religion

Ignazio Arnoz (1885–1950), Czech prelate
Ignazio Bedini (born 1939), Italian archbishop
Ignazio Busca (1731–1803), Italian cardinal
Ignazio Cannavò (born 1921), Italian archbishop
Ignazio Persico (1823–1896), Italian cardinal

Sports

Ignazio Abate (born 1986), Italian professional footballer
Ignazio Arcoleo (born 1948), Italian footballer and manager
Ignazio Belluardo (born 1986), Italian racing driver
Ignazio Fabra (1930–2008), Italian wrestler
Ignazio Giunti (1941–1971), Italian racing driver

Others

Ignazio Cardini (1566–1602), Corsican doctor and humanist
Ignazio Cerio (1841–1921), Italian physician and philosopher
Ignazio Danti (1536–1586), Italian mathematician and astronomer
Johnny Dio (1914–1979), Italian-American gangster
Ignazio Guidi (1844–1935), Italian orientalist
Ignazio Leone (1923–1976), Italian film actor
Ignazio Lupo (1877–1947), Sicilian-American gangster
Giovanni Ignazio Molina (1740–1829), Chilean naturalist and historian
Ignazio Porro (1801–1875), Italian optician
Ignazio Salvo (1932–1992), Italian businessman
Ignazio Visco (born 1949), Italian economist
Ignazio Vella (1928–2011), American businessman
Prince Sixtus of Bourbon-Parma (1886–1934), Italian nobleman
Prince Gabriel of Bourbon-Two Sicilies (1897–1975), Italian nobleman

See also

Ignjat
Ignacio
Ignatius
Inácio
Inigo

Italian masculine given names